A pharyngeal consonant is a consonant that is articulated primarily in the pharynx. Some phoneticians distinguish upper pharyngeal consonants, or "high" pharyngeals, pronounced by retracting the root of the tongue in the mid to upper pharynx, from (ary)epiglottal consonants, or "low" pharyngeals, which are articulated with the aryepiglottic folds against the epiglottis at the entrance of the larynx, as well as from epiglotto-pharyngeal consonants, with both movements being combined.

Stops and trills can be reliably produced only at the epiglottis, and fricatives can be reliably produced only in the upper pharynx. When they are treated as distinct places of articulation, the term radical consonant may be used as a cover term, or the term guttural consonants may be used instead. 

In many languages, pharyngeal consonants trigger advancement of neighboring vowels. Pharyngeals thus differ from uvulars, which nearly always trigger retraction. For example, in some dialects of Arabic, the vowel  is fronted to [æ] next to pharyngeals, but it is retracted to  next to uvulars, as in حال  'condition', with a pharyngeal fricative and a fronted vowel, compared to خال  'maternal uncle', with a uvular consonant and a retracted vowel.

In addition, consonants and vowels may be secondarily pharyngealized. Also, strident vowels are defined by an accompanying epiglottal trill.

Pharyngeal consonants in the IPA
Pharyngeal/epiglottal consonants in the International Phonetic Alphabet (IPA):

*A voiced epiglottal stop may not be possible. When an epiglottal stop becomes voiced intervocalically in Dahalo, for example, it becomes a tap. Phonetically, however, voiceless vs voiced affricates or off-glides are attested:  (Esling 2010: 695).
** Although traditionally placed in the fricative row of the IPA chart,  is usually an approximant. Frication is difficult to produce or to distinguish because the voicing in the glottis and the constriction in the pharynx are so close to each other (Esling 2010: 695, after Laufer 1996). The IPA symbol is ambiguous, but no language distinguishes fricative and approximant at this place of articulation. For clarity, the lowering diacritic may used to specify that the manner is approximant and a raising diacritic to specify that the manner is fricative.

The Hydaburg dialect of Haida has a trilled epiglottal  and a trilled epiglottal affricate ~. (There is some voicing in all Haida affricates, but it is analyzed as an effect of the vowel.)

For transcribing disordered speech, the extIPA provides symbols for upper-pharyngeal stops, ⟨⟩ and ⟨⟩.

Place of articulation
The IPA first distinguished epiglottal consonants in 1989, with a contrast between pharyngeal and epiglottal fricatives, but advances in laryngoscopy since then have caused specialists to re-evaluate their position. Since a trill can be made only in the pharynx with the aryepiglottic folds (in the pharyngeal trill of the northern dialect of Haida, for example), and incomplete constriction at the epiglottis, as would be required to produce epiglottal fricatives, generally results in trilling, there is no contrast between (upper) pharyngeal and epiglottal based solely on place of articulation. Esling (2010) thus restores a unitary pharyngeal place of articulation, with the consonants being described by the IPA as epiglottal fricatives differing from pharyngeal fricatives in their manner of articulation rather than in their place: 

Edmondson et al. distinguish several subtypes of pharyngeal consonant. Pharyngeal or epiglottal stops and trills are usually produced by contracting the aryepiglottic folds of the larynx against the epiglottis. That articulation has been distinguished as aryepiglottal. In pharyngeal fricatives, the root of the tongue is retracted against the back wall of the pharynx. In a few languages, such as Achumawi, Amis of Taiwan and perhaps some of the Salishan languages, the two movements are combined, with the aryepiglottic folds and epiglottis brought together and retracted against the pharyngeal wall, an articulation that has been termed epiglotto-pharyngeal. There are, however, several diacritics for subtypes of pharyngeal sound among the Voice Quality Symbols.

Although upper-pharyngeal plosives are not found in the world's languages, apart from the rear closure of some click consonants, they occur in disordered speech. See voiceless upper-pharyngeal plosive and voiced upper-pharyngeal plosive.

Distribution
Pharyngeals are known primarily from three areas of the world: in the Middle East and North Africa, in the Semitic (e.g. Arabic, Hebrew, Tigrinya, and Tigre), Berber and Cushitic (e.g. Somali) language families; in the Caucasus, in the Northwest, and Northeast Caucasian language families; and in British Columbia, in Haida and the Salishan and Wakashan language families.

There are scattered reports of pharyngeals elsewhere, as in Sorani and Kurmanji Kurdish, Marshallese, the Nilo-Saharan language Tama, the Siouan language Stoney (Nakoda), and the Achumawi language of California.

The approximant is more common, as it is a realization of /r/ in such European languages as Danish and Swabian German. According to the laryngeal theory, Proto-Indo-European might have had pharyngeal consonants.

The fricatives and trills (the pharyngeal and epiglottal fricatives) are frequently conflated with pharyngeal fricatives in literature. That was the case for Dahalo and Northern Haida, for example, and it is likely to be true for many other languages. The distinction between these sounds was recognized by IPA only in 1989, and it was little investigated until the 1990s.

See also
 Pharyngealization
 Strident vowel
 Ayin
 Heth
 Guttural

Notes

Sources

 Maddieson, I., & Wright, R. (1995). The vowels and consonants of Amis: A preliminary phonetic report. In I. Maddieson (Ed.), UCLA working papers in phonetics: Fieldwork studies of targeted languages III (No. 91, pp. 45–66). Los Angeles: The UCLA Phonetics Laboratory Group. (in pdf)

Place of articulation